Salisbury Cathedral from the Meadows was painted by John Constable in 1831, three years after the death of his wife, Maria. It is currently on display in London, at Tate Britain, in the Clore gallery. He later added nine lines from The Seasons by the eighteenth-century poet James Thomson that reveal the painting's meaning: That the rainbow is a symbol of hope after a storm that follows on the death of the young Amelia in the arms of her lover Celadon. Constable exhibited this painting at the Royal Academy in 1831, but continued working on it during 1833 and 1834.

Symbolic metaphor
This painting was a personal statement of his turbulent emotions and his changing states of mind. The sky reflects this turbulence and shows his emotional state of being.

Possible political meanings have been attributed to it, one of which being the clash of industrialization and nature represented through the clash of elements.

Some symbolism in this painting includes:

 Grave marker: symbol of death
 Ash tree: symbol of life
 Church: symbol of faith and resurrection
 Rainbow: symbol of renewed optimism

Constable considered this work the painting that best embodied ‘the full compass’ of his art.

Stay in the UK
In May 2013 the painting was bought by Tate for £23.1m.

The acquisition was part of Aspire, a partnership between Tate and four other national and regional galleries - Amgueddfa Cymru - National Museum Wales, the National Galleries of Scotland, Colchester and Ipswich Museums Service and Salisbury and South Wiltshire Museum, and was acquired with major grants and donations from the Heritage Lottery Fund, the Art Fund (including a contribution from the Wolfson Foundation), The Manton Foundation, and Tate Members. The partnership will enable the work and to go on "almost constant" view, ensuring that it will stay in the UK.

In 2018, after a 5-year tour of Britain, the painting returned to Tate Britain for permanent display. It now ironically hangs next to JMW Turner's Caligua’s Palace and Bridge (1831). The two paintings were at the centre of a falling out between the artists at the 1831 Royal Exhibition. Constable, that year's ‘hangman’, switched the arrangement of the paintings at the last minute. Turner, unaware of the change, was infuriated by his painting's new position and "slew Constable without remorse” at a dinner they both attended, later that evening.

See also
 Salisbury Cathedral from the Bishop's Grounds

References

Bibliography

External links
Constable's England, a full text exhibition catalog from The Metropolitan Museum of Art

1831 paintings
Paintings by John Constable
Collection of the Tate galleries
Salisbury Cathedral
Paintings in Wales
Dogs in art
Horses in art
Churches in art
Rainbows in art